Raghunathpur railway station is a railway station on the East Coast Railway network in the state of Odisha, India. It serves Raghunathpur village. Its code is RCTC. It has three platforms. Passenger, MEMU, Express trains halt at Raghunathpur railway station.

Major trains
 Santragachi–Paradeep Express
 Paradeep−Puri Intercity Express

See also
 Jagatsinghpur district

References

Railway stations in Jagatsinghpur district
Khurda Road railway division